The National Bank of Rwanda is the central bank of Rwanda.  The bank was founded in 1964. The current governor of the bank is John Rwangombwa.

Location
It is quartered at the National Bank of Rwanda Building, on KN6 Avenue in the central business district of Kigali, the capital and largest city in Rwanda. The coordinates of the bank's headquarters are 01°56'56.0"S, 30°03'49.0"E (Latitude:-1.948889; Longitude:30.063611).

Overview
The Bank is active in promoting financial inclusion policy and is a leading member of the Alliance for Financial Inclusion. It is also one of the original 17 regulatory institutions to make specific national commitments to financial inclusion under the Maya Declaration during the 2011 Global Policy Forum held in Mexico.

Governors
Governors of the National Bank of Rwanda
 Johan A. Brandon: 1964-1965
 Masaya Hattori: 1965-1971
 Jean Berchmans Birara: 1971-1985
 Augustin Ruzindana: 1985-1990
 Denis Ntirugirimbabazi: 1991-1994
 Gérard Niyitegeka: 1994-1995
 François Mutemberezi: 1996-2002
 François Kanimba: 2002-2011
 Claver Gatete: 2011-2013
 John Rwangombwa: After 2013

History
The central bank, whose name is abbreviated to "BNR", evolved step by step:

Royal Decree of 27th July 1887 establishes the franc as the money of account for the Independent State of Congo, a.k.a. Congo Free State, and Rwanda is included as well.
Heligoland Agreement of 1890 puts Rwanda and Burundi within the German sphere of influence in Africa; the German East African rupie is the official currency; circulation of the French franc continues nonetheless.
As a result of Belgium's actions, the Belgian Congo becomes a member of the Latin Monetary Union in 1908.
Bank of Belgian Congo established in 1909.
Bank of Belgian Congo issues its first banknotes in 1912.
Rwanda and Burundi attached to the Congo Franc Zone following Germany's defeat in World War I; 1927
Colony of Belgian Congo and the Bank of Belgian Congo create a new relationship; 1927–1952
World War II era: temporary involvement of the Bank of England; Congo franc is listed in London.
Belgian Congo and Ruanda-Urundi Central Bank (BCCBRU) 1952 - 1960
Banque d' Emission du Rwanda et du Burundi (BERB) / (Issuing Bank of Rwanda and Burundi) - 1960 - 1964
Royal Bank of Burundi (BRB) and the Banque Nationale du Rwanda (BNR) open in 1964.
(Banque de la République du Burundi (BRB) opens in 1966.)

See also

 Rwandan franc
 Economy of Rwanda
 List of central banks of Africa

References

External links
 

Rwanda
Banks of Rwanda
Organisations based in Kigali
Banks established in 1964
1964 establishments in Rwanda